Philip John Sherwin Pearson-Gregory (26 March 1888 – 12 June 1955) was an English cricketer.  Pearson-Gregory was a right-handed batsman.  He was born at the manor house of Harlaxton Manor in Harlaxton, Lincolnshire.  He was originally educated at Eton College before proceeding to Brasenose College, Oxford.

Pearson-Gregory made his first-class debut for Nottinghamshire against Middlesex in the 1910 County Championship.  He next represented Nottinghamshire in the 1914 season, which was to be his last in first-class cricket.  During that season he represented Nottinghamshire in 2 further first-class matches against  Yorkshire and Sussex.  In his 3 first-class matches, he scored 119 runs at a batting average of 59.50, with a single half century high score of 71.

Pearson-Gregory was referenced in 1937, then holding the title of Major.  By this time he was a widower, his wife having been killed in a road accident in 1930, when he sold Harlaxton Manor to Violet Van der Elst who renamed the site Grantham Castle. Pearson-Gregory died at St Pancras, London on 6 June 1955.

Family
His father Thomas played first-class cricket for Oxford University, the Marylebone Cricket Club and Middlesex.  His father-in-law Arthur Ridley played first-class cricket for Oxford University, the Marylebone Cricket Club, Hampshire, Kent and Middlesex.

References

External links
Philip Pearson-Gregory at Cricinfo
Philip Pearson-Gregory at CricketArchive

1888 births
1955 deaths
People from South Kesteven District
People educated at Eton College
Alumni of Brasenose College, Oxford
English cricketers
Nottinghamshire cricketers